Group 16 is a rugby league competition on the south coast of New South Wales, run under the auspices of the Country Rugby League. Group 16 covers the area from Batemans Bay down to Eden.

Due to the COVID-19 pandemic in Australia the commencement of Group 16 2020 season was postponed and subsequently cancelled.

Teams

Former clubs that once played in the area include:
  Bodalla
  Candelo-Bemboka Panthers
  Cobargo-Bermagui Eels
  Delegate Tigers
  Milton-Ulladulla Bulldogs
  Tuross Lakers

Map

Premiers

First Grade Premiers

Juniors

Batemans Bay Tigers
Ben Cross
Matthew Cross

Bega Roosters
Dale Finucane
Kezie Apps
Deon Apps

Bombala Blue Heelers
Ky Rodwell

Cooma Colts
Brett White
Sam Williams
Jack Williams
Zac Saddler
Leigh Hennessey

Merimbula-Pambula Bulldogs
Euan Aitken
Wayne Collins
Tony Paton
Pat Coman
Scott Gammell
Ben Duckworth
Tommy Hughes

Moruya Sharks
Michael Weyman
Tim Weyman
Jarrad Kennedy
Rhys Kennedy

Narooma Devils
Chris Houston
Michael Lett
Teig Wilton

Tathra Sea Eagles
Adam Elliott

Eden Tigers
Corey Stewart
Brett Kelly
Peter Kelly

Sub-Group Competitions 
From the mid-1920s to the mid-1950s Rugby League was played in what became known as sub-group competitions.

Far South Coast / Northern Sub-Group 
This competition began as the Far South Coast Rugby League in 1925, with Wyndham Oaks, Bega Waratahs, Bega Federals, Candelo, Pambula Buccaneers and Eden as the competing teams.
In 1937 the first grade competition was not held, with teams playing challenge cup matches instead, although a reserve grade competition was held. Following the 1940 Grand Final, competition was suspended due to World War Two.

Competition resumed in 1946.
 
Tip: To view original newspaper articles from The Cobargo Chronicle and Southern Record and Advertiser, hover over the blue number in the reports column and then click on the article name. That will open the article in Trove.

Pambula / Imlay 
A competition centred around Pambula was held in 1933. Four teams contested the 1936 season: Pambula, Eden, Wolumla and Burragate.

The 1947 Imlay Rugby League competition included Bemboka, Candelo, Eden, Pambula, Tathra, Wolumla and Wyndham. The Bega Rovers and Bega Wests switched from the Northern Sub-Group to the Imlay League in 1955.

Southern Monaro
The four towns of Bibbenluke, Bombala, Cathcart and Delegate regularly played Rugby Union matches in the early decades of the 20th century. The clubs trialed league rules in 1928 but returned to Union in 1929. In 1932, however, Southern Monaro Rugby League was established as a sub-group of Group 16. In 1935, the three first grade teams became two by the end of the season. Bombala fielded two teams (Blues and Blacks), and Nimmitabel joined to make a five team 1936 competition. From 1937, the clubs reverted to challenge cup matches.

Group 19 Rugby League (1950-1970)

A senior Rugby League competition under the enumeration Group 19 ran from the post-war years until 1970. Participating teams included Bibbenluke, Bombala, Delegate, Jindabyne and (usually) Adaminaby. In most seasons two or three Cooma teams participated – the Cooma Rovers and St Patricks, Cooma Blues or Cooma Citizens. Employees engaged in the Snowy River Scheme fielded teams for short periods – Public Service, Snowy and the intriguingly named Utah-Island Bend.

In 1971 the northern Group 19 clubs – Cooma Rovers, Adaminaby, Jindabyne, Cooma Citizens and Nimmitabel agreed to combine playing resources and field a team in the Group 16 competition, as the Alpine Wanderers. The three teams from southern Monaro also joined the combined competition, although they remained separate clubs.

The enumeration Group 19 was later redeployed to the northern tablelands of New South Wales, with teams from Armidale, Glen Innes, Guyra, Narwan, Uralla and Walcha competing under that banner in the 1980s.

Sources

Juniors

Group 16 Minor League Clubs 

  Batemans Bay Tigers
 Bega Roosters
 Bombala Blue Heelers
 Cooma Stallions
 Eden Tigers
 Merimbula-Pambula Bulldogs
 Moruya Sharks
 Narooma Devils
 Tathra Sea Eagles

See also

Rugby League Competitions in Australia

References

South Coast (New South Wales)
Rugby league competitions in New South Wales